Gordon Siu Kwing-chue, CBE, GBS, JP (born 29 November 1945) is a former Hong Kong civil servant. From 1993 to 2001, he was secretary for economic services, secretary for transport, head of the Central Policy Unit and secretary for planning, environment and lands.

Early life
Siu was born in 1945 and was educated at Birmingham University.

Career
He joined the civil service as an administrative officer in 1966. He held various positions in the Hong Kong government, including the deputy secretary for the Civil Service from 1981 to 1985, secretary general of the Office of Members of the Executive and Legislative Councils from 1985 to 1988 and postmaster general from 1988 to 1992. In 1993, he was appointed secretary for economic services. During his service, he was responsible for promoting the construction of Chek Lap Kok Airport as the director of New Airport Projects Co-ordination Office, the construction plan of which became an issue of the Sino-British dispute on the eve of the handover. He was later appointed secretary for transport and head of the Central Policy Unit from 1997 to 1999 after the handover. He became secretary for planning, environment and lands in 1999 until he retired from the government in 2001. Siu was awarded the honours of Commander of the Most Excellent Order of the British Empire (CBE) in 1997 and Gold Bauhinia Star (GBS) in 2002 and appointed a non-official Justice of the Peace in 2003.

Retirement
Since his retirement, he has held directorships in many companies, including China Resources Enterprise Ltd., Transport International Holdings Limited, China Resources Beer (Holdings) Company Limited, ICEA Finance Holdings Limited and ICEA Securities Limited, Tung Shing Securities (Brokers) Limited, Television Broadcasts Limited, The Kowloon Motor Bus (1933) Ltd. and Long Win Bus Company Limited, subsidiaries of Kowloon Motor Bus Co. Ltd.

Other interests
He plays violin and joined the choir at school. He received a diploma from the Royal Academy of Music and joined the Hong Kong Youth Orchestra in 1964. He went on to become the concertmaster of the orchestra in 1966 and coach in 1968. On retirement, he co-founded the Music for Our Young Foundation. He has been active in music-related works after his retirement. He has also been a non-executive director in many companies. In 1977, he was commissioned by Governor Murray MacLehose to establish the Music Office.

Personal life
He married Sarah Liao, who was also a senior civil servant and became secretary for the environment, transport and works from 2002 to 2007. They later divorced.

References

1945 births
Living people
Alumni of the Royal Academy of Music
Alumni of the University of Birmingham
Government officials of Hong Kong
Hong Kong civil servants
Hong Kong businesspeople
Hong Kong musicians
Recipients of the Gold Bauhinia Star
Commanders of the Order of the British Empire
China Resources people